Mesto tieňov or City of the Shadows, is a Slovak crime TV series which debuted on April 11, 2008 on the Markíza network. It was produced by DNA Production company with its episodes based on real life events.

The TV series received the "Televízna udalosť roka" Award (Television Event of Year) by film critics.

Casts and characters

Episode characters
  Martin Rausch
 Szidi Tobias
  Vlado Černý
  Vladimír Jedľovský
 Petra Polnišová
  Juraj Ďurdiak
 Zuzana Šebová

List of episodes

Season 1: 2008

Books 
 2008 - Marek Zákopčan - Mesto tieňov 1, Ikar 
 2008 - Marek Zákopčan - Mesto tieňov 2, Ikar

External links
 správa na medialne.sk
 správa na markiza.sk
 správa na medialne.sk
 Czechoslovak Film Database

Slovak drama television series
2008 Slovak television series debuts
2000s Slovak television series
2010s Slovak television series
Markíza original programming